Dugijan (also Romanized as Dūgījān; also known as Dogījān, Doki Jan, Dovayjān, Dūkejān, Dūkījān, and Dyugidzhan) is a village in Bonab Rural District, in the Central District of Marand County, East Azerbaijan Province, Iran. At the 2006 census, its population was 895, in 180 families.

References 

Populated places in Marand County